Frankford Junction is a railroad junction, and former junction station, located on the border between the Harrowgate neighborhood of Philadelphia and Frankford, Philadelphia. It lies near the intersection of Frankford Avenue and Butler Street, to the west of the interchange between Interstate 95 and the approach to the  Betsy Ross Bridge. It has been used for rail transportation since 1832 but has not served as a station since October 4, 1992.

Overview
The junction has seen a mass of freight and passenger service throughout its existence. In 1832 the Philadelphia and Trenton Railroad (P&T) was formed and started service with a small yard. The line extended southwest of the junction and on to destinations north.  In 1871 the railroad was leased by the Pennsylvania Railroad (PRR). During this time a new branch was formed, namely the Tioga Street Branch, consisting of trackage running down the middle of Tioga Street. The branch was later sold to the Kensington and Tacony Railroad. The Pennsylvania Railroad operated the Connecting Railway (part of today's Northeast Corridor) that carried trains to the south.

Through time the junction passed from the Pennsylvania Railroad to the Penn Central and finally to Amtrak. During the era of the PRR they operated the Congressional, which passed through the junction.

The junction started to dwindle as a station in its older years, with the last service coming from Southeastern Pennsylvania Transportation Authority (SEPTA) in the 1990s along the Trenton Line (formerly known as the R7 Line). The junction still sees many trains, both freight and passenger, none of which serve the station platforms that still exist. Today the original P&T line still stretches for a few city blocks, terminating abruptly at Ann Street. It is still used for local freight service. A Conrail freight line splits from the Northeast Corridor at this location and continues to New Jersey via the Delair Bridge. NJ Transit maintains the Atlantic City Line through the junction that serves 30th Street Station to Atlantic City Rail Terminal with local service daily.  Amtrak and SEPTA pass through on the Northeast Corridor.  There is an abandoned track that used to be for local freight on the north side of the junction. The switching yard is still maintained with continuously decreasing service.

Accidents 
On September 6, 1943, a deadly accident occurred when an axle detached from a train as the result of an undiscovered hot box, causing it to derail. 79 people were killed and more were injured.

On May 12, 2015, Amtrak Northeast Regional #188 from Washington DC to New York derailed as it was traversing Frankford Junction. Eight people were killed.

See also 
 Delair Bridge along the Atlantic City Line is just southeast of Frankford Junction
 1943 Frankford Junction train wreck details the September 6, 1943 accident
 2015 Philadelphia train derailment describes the May 12, 2015 incident
 Lists of rail accidents

References 

Rail infrastructure in Pennsylvania
Rail transportation in Philadelphia
Rail junctions in the United States
Former SEPTA Regional Rail stations
Stations on the Northeast Corridor
Former railway stations in Philadelphia
Former Pennsylvania Railroad stations